Mykytenko or Mikitenko is a Ukrainian surname. Notable people with the surname include:

 Irina Mikitenko (born 1972), German long-distance runner
 Leonid Mykytenko (1944–2019), Ukrainian long-distance runner
 Olga Mykytenko (born 1974), Ukrainian-German opera singer

See also
 
 

Ukrainian-language surnames